The Heart of Jennifer is a 1915 American silent drama film directed by James Kirkwood, Sr. and written by Edith Barnard Delano. The film stars Hazel Dawn, James Kirkwood, Sr., Irene Howley, Russell Bassett, and Harry C. Browne. The film was released on August 30, 1915, by Paramount Pictures.

Plot
A man gives aid to another man on the condition that he can marry the man's daughter. The daughter refuses and goes to a lumber camp with her father. At the lumber camp she marries a man named James Murry. The first man finds her and convinces her husband that she only married him for the money. This causes problems in their relationship. The man ends up getting her sister pregnant too and when he refuses to marry her, the sister kills him. To protect her sister the woman claims to have done it. The lumber camp man realizes his wife was only sacrificing herself for her sister, and that effort helps to reunite the couple.

Cast 

Hazel Dawn as Jennifer Hale
James Kirkwood, Sr. as James Murray
Irene Howley as Agnes Murray
Russell Bassett as Mr. Hale, Jennifer's Father
Harry C. Browne as Stephen Weldon

Preservation
No prints of the film have survived. It is now lost.

References

External links 

 

1915 films
1910s English-language films
Silent American drama films
1915 drama films
Paramount Pictures films
Films directed by James Kirkwood Sr.
American black-and-white films
American silent feature films
Lost American films
1915 lost films
Lost drama films
1910s American films